Broadgreen Primary School, is a primary school located in Liverpool, Old Swan,  England. The primary school has 291 pupils in total.  
The school now has a new headteacher, Mrs A. M. Moore, who officially started in September 2012.

School's Connections and Awards
The school has a Foundation Trust status in partnership with Broadgreen International School and Liverpool Hope and Liverpool John Moores universities.  The International Baccalaureate was awarded to Broadgreen Primary School in June 2012.  They also achieved the prestigious 'Green Flag' eco award.

Services
Playdays Kids Club has now recently hired parts of the school, to provide a Kids Club to pupils parents who work. Playdays offers a breakfast and after school club and caters on-site from 8:00 am until 6:00 pm.

References

External links
 Ofsted Page for Broadgreen Primary School
 Ofsted Page for Playdays Kids Club & Playgroup

Primary schools in Liverpool
Foundation schools in Liverpool